Pesqueira may refer to:

Pesqueira, Pernambuco, a municipality in Pernambuco, Brazilian
Pesqueira, Sonora, a town in San Miguel de Horcasitas Municipality, Sonora, Mexico
Villa Pesqueira, a municipality in Sonora, Mexico
São João da Pesqueira, a municipality in Viseu district, Portugal

See also
 Pesquera (disambiguation)
 Pesquería